Gioia Barbieri and Jeļena Ostapenko were the defending champions, but both players chose not to participate.

Belgian-duo Elise Mertens and An-Sophie Mestach won the title, defeating Swiss-duo Viktorija Golubic and Xenia Knoll in the final, 6–4, 3–6, [10–7].

Seeds

Draw

References 
 Draw

2016 ITF Women's Circuit